A bicycle trailer is a motorless wheeled frame with a hitch system for transporting cargo by bicycle. It can greatly increase a bike's cargo capacity,  allowing point-to-point haulage of objects up to 4 cubic yards (3 cubic metres) in volume that weigh as much as half a ton.

Types
Different types of trailer are designed for various purposes, cargo requirements and riding conditions:

By number of wheels

 Single-wheel: a single rear-mounted wheel. Though of limited towing capacity, this design tends to be more stable (when moving) than trailers with two or more wheels. The single wheel can tilt from side to side when cornering (as the bicycle itself does,) allowing for coordinated turns at relatively high speed. The connection to the bicycle is simpler than a two-wheeled trailer since only two degrees of freedom are required- the trailer tilts with the towing bicycle.
 Two-wheel: A two-wheel design makes possible much greater load carrying capacity and a wider cargo bed. Though not suitable for high speed, they are ideal for everyday cycling (very much like towing a trailer behind a car). Two-wheel trailers tend to be as wide or wider than the handlebars of the bicycle, therefore care needs to be taken when riding through narrow spaces.
 Three-wheel: Similar to two-wheel trailers with wheels on either side of the cargo area, but also equipped with a fork-mounted front wheel to remove practically all tongue weight from the lead vehicle. This trailer is usually connected via a fork-mounted tow bar and allows for the greatest weight capacity out of all types of bicycle trailers, in some instances even equipped with its own overrun brakes and electric motor assist.

By intended cargo
 General cargo: for transporting cargo of all kinds. The load capacity of commercially available cargo trailers ranges from 30 to 300 pounds (14 to 140 kg), but much larger loads have been transported by custom-built trailers or by multi-trailer "trains" attached to a single bicycle.
 Human passenger (as cargo): constructed to enhance the comfort and safety of one or more human passengers. These usually have a low centre of gravity and widely spaced wheels to increase stability when cornering, and often have integrated rain-proof covers, seat padding, and safety belts. A lot of the trailers designed for transporting children can also be converted to strollers. Trailers have also been used as pedicabs.
 Child passenger (as rider): trailer bikes and pedal trailer, one-wheel trailers (tandem trailers) with integrated seat, handle bars, and drive train, that normally attaches to the bike via the seat post (and operate very much like a tandem). These allow small children who can't yet ride a bicycle alone to accompany adult riders as participants and motive-power producers. These trailers are by far the most popular style.
 Canoe and kayak: designed for towing long, thin, relatively light-weight loads such as canoes, kayaks, or wind surfing rigs.
 Disabled passenger: made for safely towing wheelchairs with persons in them.
 Pets: for carrying small domestic animals, especially dogs, that weigh less than 100 lb (45 kg).

Electric trailers
 Electric bike trailers are trailer with electric propulsion. Most are electric pusher trailers. They are made by various manufacturers. Examples are Aevon Trailers (Cycloboost), Ridekick International (Ridekick), Topeak (Journey Trailer), etc.

Limits on load
 Heavier loads on trailers increase the safety risks. Trailers with brakes (often referred to as braking trailers) allow heavier loads to be safely towed.
 According to the ASTM standard, a limit of  can be carried in a trailer without brakes. The heavier the load, the more hazardous the ride becomes due to the inability to stop the trailer from continuing to move forward into the cyclist. This hazard can be diminished if a braking system is added to the trailer, typically some form of overrun or inertial braking system.

Components

Axle 
Most trailers have a separate axle for each wheel, like those used on a bicycle. These separate axles usually mount directly on the frame using either threaded nuts, a quick-release mechanism, or some press fit arrangement. The use of separate axles for two-wheel trailers allows the load carrying area to be between the wheels with its base below the axles, so as to keep the centre of gravity relatively low.

Some trailers support a normal axle on two sides, others mount the wheel off one side with a stub axle (a one sided axle).

Brakes
 Drum Brakes: Currently the only type of brake that may be found on bicycle trailers are drum brakes with an inertial rotating actuator.

Fender/mud guard 
If included, the fender (or just a mud flap) helps to protect the cargo and the towing bicycle from road spray and dirt. On heavy-duty trailers, the fender may be designed to be capable of bearing heavy loads.

Frame 
 Metal: usually steel or aluminum alloy tubing, assembled by brazing, welding, or nuts and bolts.
 Wood (or bamboo):  seldom seen but sometimes used in makeshift and home-built trailers, fastened with glue, nails, screws, bolts, or a combination thereof.

Hitch 

There are various types, from home made to those supplied by the trailer manufacturers.

Hitch positions:
 Seatpost: Temporary or permanent clamp assembly attaching the trailer hitch to the seat post.
 Rear axle: Special attachment points, integral to the rear quick release skewer or bolted onto solid axles, hold dropouts cut into the trailer hitch.
 Chainstay: Two-piece sandwiching clamp screws tight over left rear triangle, with protruding socket-and-pin receiver.
 Rear cargo or pannier rack: Some improvised hitches attach to the rear cargo rack or pannier frame. Since rear racks are not structural parts of the bicycle they cannot handle much weight or torque loading.
 Improvised: Ropes, bungee cord, chain, cable, etc. Usually not dependable, often dangerous to rider and cargo.

Single-wheel trailers generally use a special frame hitch which attaches to both sides of the rear axle, and which incorporates a vertical hinge to allow cornering. Attaching the trailer at the seat-post can (dependent on the design) place the load at a lower point relative to the longitudinal pivot axis of the attached trailer. This can make it possible to wheel a loaded single-wheel trailer around while disconnected from the bike, as the seat-post hitch is a natural height for grasping while walking upright.

Hitches for two-wheel trailers must incorporate some form of universal joint or flexible coupling. If the joint relies on a certain amount of play to give the required movement, then there is the possibility of resonance at certain pedaling speeds and trailer loads. The effect is that the trailer feels as if it is 'bumping' the bicycle. However, there are other methods such as spring with a nylon tube inserted through the middle to provide rigidity and flexibility, allowing the bicycle to lean while the trailer remains upright and isolates the bicycle from any resonance.

Two-wheel trailers which attach to the rear axle or chainstay generally have an angled towbar to help keep the trailer central behind the bicycle.

Wheel 
 Traditional spoked bicycle wheel in various sizes. Has the advantage of being light, strong, readily available. Pneumatic tires provide some suspension for the load, larger diameters ride smoothly and have much less drag than many other types of wheels.
 Solid metal wheels with solid treads, such as dolly wheels. Extremely durable but rough riding and usually slow due to small diameter.

Standards

A voluntary European standard (EN 15918) for two-wheel bicycle trailers was published in September 2011.

This standard applies to trailers carrying cargo and/or up to 2 passengers, and enforces a maximum gross weight of 60 kg. There are many safety-related requirements, including restraints, structural integrity, stability, small parts, sharp edges, etc.

The North American standard, last updated on December 27, 2016, urges a maximum accessory load of 45.4 kg to not be exceeded; the standard applies to non-powered bicycle trailers carrying 1 or 2 children passengers.

See also

 Outline of cycling
 Trailer (vehicle)
 Cargo bike

References

External links

 Angus adventures "Which trailer is right for you?" 
 

Cycling equipment
Utility cycling